A corporate merger between True Corporation and DTAC, Thailand's second- and third–largest mobile network operators, has been in progress since its first public announcement on 22 November 2021. The deal, which would make the combined entity the largest mobile network ahead of current market leader AIS and reduce the mobile provider market to a duopoly, has been strongly opposed by academics and civil society groups as detrimental to consumers and the public interest. The National Broadcasting and Telecommunications Commission (NBTC) acknowledged the merger with certain conditions on 20 October 2022, though there had been some legal uncertainty over whether the NBTC had authority to approve such a merger and whether the Trade Competition Commission should be involved. Petitions challenging the decision were made to the Administrative Court in November, by the Thailand Consumers Council and AIS.

The company Citrine Global was formed as a joint venture between True parent Charoen Pokphand Group and DTAC parent Telenor. The company was registered with the Department of Business Development on 9 July 2021 with a registered capital of 100,000 baht. Its office is located at 313 CP Tower Building, Silom Road, Silom, Bang Rak, Bangkok

The company began to appear in its name and role as a Tender Offeror of True and DTAC. After True and DTAC will be merged together, The company will buy shares from True at a price of 5.09 baht per share and buy shares from DTAC at a price of 47.76 baht per share. The merger was expected to be completed in late September 2022. Later on 4 April 2022, At the 2022 Annual General Meeting of Shareholders of True Corporation, the meeting resolved to approve the merger with DTAC, Same for DTAC, The meeting on the same day that the Extraordinary General Meeting of Shareholders resolved to approve the merger with True Corporation. The merger was "acknowledged" by the regulator NBTC at a meeting on 20 October 2022. The newly merged company still retain the True Corporation name, which was founded on 1 March 2023 and it was listed on the Stock Exchange of Thailand under the stock ticker symbol TRUE on 3 March 2023.

References

Further reading

Charoen Pokphand
True Corporation
China Mobile
Telenor
2023 mergers and acquisitions
Telecommunications in Thailand
2022 in Thailand